The Hassayampa Bridge is a bridge spanning the Hassayampa River in Hassayampa, Arizona, located in Maricopa County. The bridge was completed in 1929 and was listed on the National Register of Historic Places in 1988. The bridge was scheduled for demolition in 1983.

History
In 1915, a timber bridge was built spanning the river. It was upgraded to a more permanent structure in 1922 with the addition of two steel trusses. In 1927, the Arizona Highway Department began to assess how to replace the existing structure with a permanent structure. Based on a concrete slab-and-girder structure, they solicited bids for the project. In 1928 they received bids from four companies, based on that design: R. H. Martin (Tucson, Arizona ), the Levy Construction Company (Denver, Colorado), Wickes Engineering and
Construction Company (Des Moines, Iowa), and Strong and Grant (Springville, Utah). The contract was awarded to the low bidder, Strong and Grant, on December 4, 1928, for the sum of $47,325. Construction began in January 1929 and was completed in July of the same year.

With the completion in 1929 of a concrete structure, the last obstacle on the state's most major east–west route, U.S. Route 80 was eliminated. US 80 was an early coast-to-coast highway in the United States, and this was an important construction on that route. At the time of its construction, US 80 was Arizona's most heavily trafficked highway. With the implementation of the Interstate Highway System in the late 1950s, the bridge was re-designated to county road status.

Structure
The original design by the Arizona Highway Department consisted of a multi-span concrete slab-and-girder structure, with concrete abutments and piers. The bridge is an example of a standard construction structure used during the 1920s and 1930s, four-rib concrete deck girder. It consists of seven  spans, and is considered one of the more noteworthy examples of its type in Arizona. On September 30, 1988, the bridge was listed on the National Register of Historic Places.

The substructure is made up of concrete abutments and wingwalls with solid concrete piers. Other features of the bridge include moulded concrete guardrails with arch-pierced concrete walls, cantilevered roadway with tapered cantilevered brackets, and tapered girder haunches at piers.

Further notes
The historic Hassayampa Bridge was modified and repaired in 1993. The bridge, which is described as a concrete slab and girder, is located in the Old U.S. Highway Route 80 over the Hassayampa River between Salome Highway and 309 Avenue in the areas of Hassayampa and Arlington within the boundaries of the town of Buckeye, Arizona.

The bridge was documented with drawings and photographs by the Historic American Engineering Record.

The bridge was scheduled for demolition in 1993.

See also

List of bridges documented by the Historic American Engineering Record in Arizona
List of bridges on the National Register of Historic Places in Arizona
National Register of Historic Places listings in Pima County, Arizona

Notes

References

Road bridges on the National Register of Historic Places in Arizona
Concrete bridges in the United States
Girder bridges in the United States
Historic American Engineering Record in Arizona
National Register of Historic Places in Maricopa County, Arizona
Transportation buildings and structures in Maricopa County, Arizona